The FM and TV mast Katowice / Kosztowy (RTCN Katowice / Kosztowy) is a 358,7 metre tall guyed mast for FM and TV situated at Mysłowice - near Kosztowy, Poland. It replaced the TVP Katowice Mast which was dismantled in the 1970s.

The TVP Katowice Mast which it replaced was a 225-metre-high guyed steel framework mast with a triangular cross-section near Katowice, Poland. It was not the transmission site for the medium-wave frequency 1080 kHz. This frequency is transmitted by the transmitter Koszęcin.

The FM and TV mast Katowice / Kosztowy is since the collapse of the Warsaw radio mast the tallest structure in Poland. It was inaugurated on June 23, 1976. Originally its height was 269 metres. In 1987 it was converted to its actual value.

Transmitted Programs

Digital Television MPEG-4

Digital Radio Programs

Analogue Radio Programs

See also
 List of masts

External links
 EmiTel
 Mast in RadioPolska
 DVB-T map in Silesia
 Coverage map
 TV Katowice History
 

Radio masts and towers in Poland
Silesian Voivodeship
Mysłowice
Towers completed in 1976
1976 establishments in Poland
Buildings and structures in Silesian Voivodeship